Trillium catesbaei, also known as bashful trillium, Catesby's trillium, or bashful wakerobin, is a species of flowering plant in the family Melanthiaceae. It is found in the southeastern United States where its northern limit includes the Great Smoky Mountains and other parts of North Carolina and Tennessee. Its southernmost natural occurrence is in Escambia County, Alabama. Most of its populations are in the Piedmont from North Carolina to Alabama, under deciduous trees such as American beech, various oak and hickory species, and tulip poplar. Like most trilliums, it prefers moist, humus-rich soil in shade.

Trillium catesbaei is a perennial herbaceous plant that spreads by means of underground rhizomes. Stems are up to 45 cm tall, with white, pink, or rose-colored flowers that sometimes turn darker pink as they get older. Sometimes the flowers are hidden behind green or yellow bracts (hence the "bashful" part of one of the common names).

References

External links
 
 Images in the  U.S. National Herbarium Plant Image Collection
 

catesbaei
Flora of the Southeastern United States
Flora of the Appalachian Mountains
Natural history of the Great Smoky Mountains
Endemic flora of the United States
Least concern flora of the United States
Plants described in 1817